The Rieleros de Aguascalientes (English: Aguascalientes Railroaders)  are a professional baseball team in the Mexican League based in Aguascalientes, Mexico.

History
Baseball arrived in Aguascalientes in hand with the railroad at the beginning of the 20th century. A group of Mexican and American railroad workers on the Mexican Central Railway held a baseball game in March 1902. The teams, the Aguascalientes Mexicans and American Railways, played the first game in the state on the railroad's land.

In 1975, the Rieleros were founded by Raul Medina Reyes in partnership with Don Pedro Barbosa and other local entrepreneurs. Funds were raised through the issue of shares. A survey was then conducted to select a team name. The name Rieleros was chosen to honor the area's railroad heritage.

In 2008, the Rieleros de Aguascalientes were transferred to Nuevo Laredo, Tamaulipas, and were renamed the Tecolotes de Nuevo Laredo. They returned to Aguascalientes in 2012.

Roster

External links

References

Baseball teams established in 1975
Mexican League teams
1975 establishments in Mexico
Aguascalientes City
Sports teams in Aguascalientes